Maureen Callahan is an American writer and editor for the New York Post known for her opinion pieces regarding politics, feminism, pop culture, and current events.

Early life and education 
Callahan is of Irish-American heritage and grew up on Long Island. She earned a Bachelor of Arts degree from the School of Visual Arts in New York City.

Career 
Callahan began working for Sassy magazine and MTV at age 17. Marc Spitz wrote about going to a Michael Jackson concert and sharing the experience of growing up in the 1980s with Callahan in his book Poseur: a memoir of downtown New York in the '90s.

She has written for Sassy, Spin, New York magazine, MTV, and Vanity Fair. She authored Champagne Supernovas: Kate Moss, Marc Jacobs, Alexander McQueen, and the '90s Renegades Who Remade Fashion, a 2014 non-fiction account of the fashion industry and Poker Face: The Rise and Rise of Lady Gaga in 2010.

Callahan received an ASCAP-Deems Taylor award as co-author of "Don't Drink the Brown Water", a piece in SPIN magazine about what led to riots and violence at Woodstock '99. Callahan was interviewed as a part of Woodstock 99: Peace, Love, and Rage a documentary produced by HBO.

In 2016, Irish America listed Callahan as one of its "Top 50 Power Women" of the year. In 2019, Callahan published the true crime book American Predator.

Bibliography
Champagne Supernovas: Kate Moss, Marc Jacobs, Alexander McQueen, and the '90s Renegades Who Remade Fashion by Maureen Callahan, Simon and Schuster, September 2, 2014
Poker Face: The Rise and Rise of Lady Gaga by Maureen Callahan, Hachette Books, September 14, 2010

References

 

Living people
Year of birth missing (living people)
School of Visual Arts alumni
American women journalists
New York Post people